Thomas Robb (born 1946) is an American white supremacist, Ku Klux Klan leader and Christian Identity pastor. He is the National Director of The Knights Party, also known as the Knights of the Ku Klux Klan, taking control of the organization in 1989.

Early life
Robb was born in Detroit, Michigan, and grew up in Tucson, Arizona. He attended college in Colorado.

Christian Identity and Klan activities
Robb is the pastor of the Christian Revival Center in Zinc, Arkansas, a Christian Identity center where Robb espouses racism and antisemitism. Robb's "Thomas Robb Ministries" website declares that "the Anglo Saxon [sic], Germanic, Scandinavian, and kindred people are THE people of the Bible."

In 1989, Robb took over the Knights of the Ku Klux Klan, originally led by David Duke. In a bid to gain mainstream acceptance, he took the title of "National Director" instead of "Imperial Wizard", and chose to rename the organization "The Knights Party". He also decided to accept members via mail-in forms, rather than through initiation rites that had been common Klan practice in the past. Robb defends the Klan as a harmless organization, claiming that it is "gentle, upbeat, and friendly"; when featured in the PBS documentary Banished, Robb compared a Klan hood to a businessman's tie, claiming that "it's just tradition".

Robb has maintained ties to other far-right groups; he has spoken at the Aryan Nations' annual "World Congress" of hate group leaders, appeared on Jamie Kelso's white supremacist Voice of Reason Radio Network, and contributed regularly to the white supremacist Internet forum Stormfront. In 1996 Robb began to pioneer the concept that white people were being targeted for genocide.

In 2009, Robb's daughter Rachel Pendergraft and his granddaughters, Charity and Shelby Pendergraft, formed a "white nationalist" band called Heritage Connection.

Robb's Party publishes The Crusader, a quarterly publication. In November 2016, just days before the presidential election, Robb wrote a front-page article under the title "Make America Great Again" in The Crusader, devoted to a lengthy endorsement of Donald Trump and Trump's message. The Trump campaign responded by denouncing The Crusader article.

References

1946 births
Living people
People from Boone County, Arkansas
Politicians from Detroit
Politicians from Tucson, Arizona
Far-right politicians in the United States
American Christian creationists
Christian Identity
Ku Klux Klan Grand Dragons
Activists from Arkansas
Arkansas Independents
Arizona Independents
Colorado Independents